There are many theatre groups and venues for the performing arts in Louisiana, most notably in New Orleans.

Abbeville

 Abbey Players

Alexandria

 Coughlin-Saunders Performing Arts Center
 Hearn Stage at The Kress Theatre
 Rapides Opera House

Baton Rouge

 Greek Theatre
 Reilly Theatre
 Raising Cane's River Center
 Manship Theatre
 Southern University Theatre

Hammond

 Columbia Theatre for the Performing Arts

Metairie

 Jefferson Performing Arts Center

New Orleans

 Anthony Bean Community Theater
 Carver Theater
 Civic Theatre
 Joy Theater
 Le Petit Theatre du Vieux Carre
 Mahalia Jackson Theater of the Performing Arts
 Orpheum Theater
 Saenger Theatre
 State Palace Theatre

Ponchatoula
 Swamplight Theatre

Shreveport

 RiverView Theater
 Shreveport Municipal Memorial Auditorium
 Strand Theatre

St. Martinville

 Duchamp Opera House

Thibodaux

 Thibodaux Playhouse, Inc.

Theatres in Louisiana
Louisiana
Theaters